The International Telecommunication Union member states are the  sovereign states that are members of the International Telecommunication Union (ITU) and have equal representation at its supreme decision-making body, the ITU Plenipotentiary Conference. The ITU is the world's oldest intergovernmental organization having been founded in 1865.

References 
Notes

Citations

United Nations-related lists